Yosemite Airport may refer to:

 Fresno Yosemite International Airport in Fresno, California, United States (FAA: FAT)
 Mammoth Yosemite Airport in Mammoth Lakes, California, United States (FAA: MMH)
 Mariposa-Yosemite Airport in Mariposa, California, United States (FAA: MPI)